Callionymus martinae, Martina's dragonet, is a species of dragonet endemic to the Pacific waters around Taiwan where it occurs at depths of from . The specific name honours Miss Martina Wolf, of Braunschweig, for her "continued interest" in the author's, Ronald Fricke's, studies.

References 

M
Fish described in 1981
Taxa named by Ronald Fricke